The 1901 Maryland Aggies football team was an American football team that represented Maryland Agricultural College (later part of the University of Maryland) as an independent during the 1901 college football season. In its first and only season under head coach Emmons Dunbar, the team compiled a 1–7 record and was outscored by at total of 129 to 49. The team's only victory came in a game against a team from a U.S. Marine Corps barracks in Washington, D. C.

Schedule

References

Maryland
Maryland Terrapins football seasons
Maryland Aggies football